Larix potaninii is a species of larch conifer in the family Pinaceae. It is found in China and Nepal. The one of southernmost species of the genus Larix, the range of Larix potaninii extends southward almost to 27° N.

Varieties
, Plants of the World Online accepted four varieties:
Larix potaninii var. chinensis L.K.Fu & Nan Li – south Shaanxi (China)
Larix potaninii var. himalaica (W.C.Cheng & L.K.Fu) Farjon & Silba – south Tibet to Nepal
Larix potaninii var. macrocarpa Y.W.Law – southwest Sichuan, northwest Yunnan (China)
Larix potaninii var. potaninii – east Tibet to central China

References

potaninii
Least concern plants
Flora of Northeast India
Taxonomy articles created by Polbot
Deciduous conifers